Philip Greenberg is a Professor of Medicine, Oncology and Immunology at the University of Washington and Head of Program in Immunology at Fred Hutchinson Cancer Research Center. His research is centered around T cell biology and therapeutic cell therapies. He is a co-founder of Juno Therapeutics and Affini-T.

Education and research
Greenberg graduated from Washington University in St. Louis with at degree in Biology. He received his M.D. in 1971 from SUNY Downstate Medical Center. After completing postdoctoral training at the University of California at San Diego, he joined the Fred Hutchinson Cancer Research Center and the Division of Oncology at the University of Washington in 1976. His research is focused on T cell adoptive immune therapy. His group demonstrated the potential of isolating antigen-specific T cells and growing them to perform in vivo activity against a disease.  His group is now working on re-engineering T cells to produce TCR-T that will work for other non-leukemia malignancies.

Awards and honors

 2019 E. Donnall Thomas Lecture and Prize, American Society of Hematology
 2019 Elected a Distinguished Fellow of the American Association of Immunologists
 2018 awarded SITC’s highest honor, the Richard V. Smalley, M.D., Memorial Award and Lectureship
 2018 Gold Award for Achievement in Medical Research, Seattle Business Magazine
 2017-2020 elected Board of Directors, AACR
 2015 Editor-In-Chief, Cancer Immunology Research, AACR
 2011 William B. Coley Award for Distinguished Research in Basic and Tumor Immunology, Cancer Research Institute
 2008 Elected Fellow, American College of Physicians
 2007 Elected Fellow, American Association for the Advancement of Science
 1998 Elected Member, Association of American Physicians
 1991, 2007 National Institutes of Health MERIT Award
 1987 Elected Member, American Society for Clinical Investigation
 1978-1981 American Cancer Society Junior Clinical Faculty Fellowship

References

External links
 

Year of birth missing (living people)
Living people
Washington University in St. Louis alumni
University of Washington faculty
SUNY Downstate Medical Center alumni
Members of the American Society for Clinical Investigation
Fellows of the American Association for the Advancement of Science
Fellows of the American College of Physicians
20th-century American scientists
21st-century American scientists
Scientists from Seattle
American hematologists
Fred Hutchinson Cancer Research Center people